Mohamed Hamlaoui Stadium is a multi-use stadium in Constantine, Algeria.  It is currently used mostly for football matches. The stadium has an actual capacity of 22,986 people. It serves as the home ground of CS Constantine and MO Constantine.

history
Two years after the start of its construction in 1971, the largest stadium in Constantine opened its doors on the 11th anniversary of the country's independence, on July 5, 1973. It then took the name of Chahid Slimane Daoudi dit Hamlaoui, a nationalist militant who died during the Algerian war.
The first match in this stadium took place on Wednesday, April 3, 1974, during the final of the military championship.
November 17, 1978, the Chahid-Hamlaoui stadium hosted the first friendly match of the Algerian national team, which met its Congolese counterpart, this match ended with a victory for the Greens by 3-0.

In the early 1980s, the Chahid-Hamlaoui stadium hosted the matches of the Algerian national team during the 1982 World Cup qualifiers, where it witnessed the first qualification in the history of the Algerian team for the World Cup.
The stadium hosted the matches of Sudan, Niger, and finally, Nigeria, all of which saw victory for Algeria, including the last game against Nigeria, with the two goals of Lakhdar Belloumi and Rabah Madjer.
  
In 2007, it benefited from renovations including the installation of a natural lawn as well as the rehabilitation of its changing rooms. The work was carried out in particular to improve the conditions of the stadium's residents, but also to see the Algerian national team evolve.

In 2020, the stadium benefited from a major rehabilitation project in anticipation of the 2022 African Nations Championship, organized by Algeria between 8 and 31 January 2023. The rehabilitation works included the construction of a natural grass lawn, the placement of a giant screen with a high-quality image, the restoration of the stands, the reinforcement of the roof, the development of new entrances and aisles of this structure, as well as the endowment portals by electronic ticketing equipment.

Tenants and events

2022 African Nations Championship
The stadium was renovated in 2022 to host some of the games of the 2022 African Nations Championship it hosted three matches of Group C and one match in the quarter-finals it was initially planned to host 5 games at the group stage but Morocco, one of the teams at group c, has withdrawn from the tournament on 12 January 2023, after hosts Algeria refused to allow the squad to take a direct flight from Rabat to Constantine via their national airline and official carrier sponsor, Royal Air Maroc. As a result, the three games of morocco at the group got canceled.

Algeria national football team matches

The Stade Mohamed Hamlaoui has hosted six games of the Algeria national football team, against China PR and Sudan in 1980, Niger and Nigeria in 1981, Egypt in 1989, and the Senegal in 1990.

See also

List of football stadiums in Algeria
List of association football stadiums by capacity

References

External links 
 Stadium file - worldstadiums.com

Mohamed Hamlaoui
Buildings and structures in Constantine, Algeria
CS Constantine